is a railway station in the city of Toyota, Aichi Prefecture, Japan, operated by the third sector Aichi Loop Railway Company.

Lines

Station layout
The station has a single island platform on an embankment, with the station building located underneath. The station building has automated ticket machines, TOICA automated turnstiles and is staffed.

Platforms

Adjacent stations

Station history
Shigō Station was opened on January 31, 1988 with the opening of the Aichi Loop Railway Company.

Passenger statistics
In fiscal 2017, the station was used by an average of 1390 passengers daily.

Surrounding area
 Toyota North Fire Department
 Tsusazage Agricultural High School

See also
 List of railway stations in Japan

References

External links

Official home page 

Railway stations in Japan opened in 1988
Railway stations in Aichi Prefecture
Toyota, Aichi